Eulamprotes nigritella is a moth of the family Gelechiidae. It was described by Philipp Christoph Zeller in 1847. It is found on Malta, Sardinia and Sicily, as well as in Italy.

References

External links
 "Eulamprotes nigritella (Zeller, 1847)". Insecta.pro. Retrieved February 5, 2020.

Moths described in 1847
Eulamprotes
Moths of Europe